Joseph Bryan (August 18, 1773 – September 12, 1812) was an American politician who served as a member of the United States House of Representatives for Georgia's at-large congressional district from 1803 to 1806.

Early life 
Bryan was born Savannah, Georgia. He was educated by private tutors and attended the University of Oxford in England.

Career 
Bryan traveled in France during the American Revolutionary War. He later engaged in agricultural pursuits on Wilmington Island, Georgia.

Bryan was elected as a Republican to the 8th and 9th United States congresses and served from March 4, 1803, until his resignation in 1806. He engaged in planting and died on his estate, Nonchalance, Wilmington Island, near Savannah in 1812. He was buried in the family burial ground on his estate.

Bryan's grandfather was Jonathan Bryan, who assisted James Edward Oglethorpe in setting out the Savannah colony and served in the Revolutionary War.

References

1773 births
1812 deaths
Politicians from Savannah, Georgia
Democratic-Republican Party members of the United States House of Representatives from Georgia (U.S. state)